Alexander Stockdale (c. 1509 – 1563), of Kingston upon Hull, Yorkshire, was an English politician and landowner.

Family
Stockdale was married to Grace née Estofte, and they had a son and a daughter.

Career
Stockdale was Mayor of Kingston upon Hull from 1544 to 1545, 1551 to 1552, and 1558 to 1559.

He was a Member (MP) of the Parliament of England for Kingston upon Hull in March 1553 and April 1554.

References

1563 deaths
Politicians from Kingston upon Hull
Mayors of Kingston upon Hull
Year of birth uncertain
English MPs 1553 (Edward VI)
English MPs 1554